José Manuel Cora Amaro (born May 14, 1965) is a former Major League Baseball player with an 11-year career in MLB spanning the years 1987 and 1989–1998 and current third base coach for the New York Mets. He played for the San Diego Padres of the National League and the Chicago White Sox, Seattle Mariners and Cleveland Indians of the American League. He primarily played as a second baseman.

Career

Playing career
Cora attended Vanderbilt University and played college baseball for the Commodores. In 1984, he played collegiate summer baseball for the Chatham A's of the Cape Cod Baseball League (CCBL). He hit .373 with 28 stolen bases, and was named the league's most valuable player. In 2017, he was inducted into the CCBL Hall of Fame.

The San Diego Padres selected Cora in the first round (23rd overall) of the 1985 MLB draft. As a member of the Beaumont Golden Gators, Cora was stabbed after a game in San Antonio, Texas, on June 22, 1986. Cora was waiting outside the team bus following the game against the San Antonio Missions at V.J. Keefe Stadium when two men called his name and then assaulted him. He was stabbed once in the stomach and once in the arm. Cora was quickly rushed to the hospital and later made a full recovery after spending six weeks on the disabled list. A man named Jose Puente, 29, was caught at the scene and was later charged with attempted murder. Cora had exchanged words with fans outside of the visitor's dressing room, resulting in the fans returning with more men later on.

Cora debuted in the major leagues on April 6, 1987 as a 21-year-old rookie. In his first career game, he started at second base and finished the game 2-for-5 in a 4–3 loss to the San Francisco Giants. After spending parts of three seasons with the Padres, Cora was traded to the Chicago White Sox along with Kevin Garner and Warren Newson in exchange for pitchers Adam Peterson and Steve Rosenberg on March 31, 1991.  Cora spent the next four seasons with the White Sox before becoming a free agent.

On April 6, 1995, Cora signed with the Seattle Mariners. His 24-game hitting streak was a Mariners record (later broken by Ichiro Suzuki) and was an AL record for switch hitters (until broken by Kansas City's Jose Offerman in 1997). In 1997, he was elected to the AL All-Star team and went on to hit .300 with 11 home runs and 54 RBI in 149 games.
 
In the bottom of 11th inning of the deciding Game 5 of the 1995 American League Division Series, Cora bunted and dove into first base, narrowly avoiding the tag, kicking off the game-winning rally in which he scored on Edgar Martínez's walk-off double.

Cora spent most of the 1998 season as a Mariner, but with the team falling out of contention, he was dealt to the Cleveland Indians in exchange for David Bell on August 31. He finished the season batting a combined .276 with six home runs and 32 RBI in 155 games. Cora signed a free-agent contract with the Toronto Blue Jays during the off-season, but retired without playing a game.

Coaching career
Following his retirement from play, Cora was hired in 2000 with the Chicago Cubs minor league team, the Daytona Cubs. He was later hired by teammate and good friend, Ozzie Guillén as a coach in 2003 for the Chicago White Sox. His responsibilities included facilitating the role of third base coach and organizing the team's spring training camps prior to his promotion to bench coach following the 2006 season. He occasionally served as an interim manager whenever Guillen was suspended or ejected from a game, or was unable to attend for any other reason.

He managed the Venezuelan Winter League baseball team Tiburones de la Guaira in the 2005–2006 season with a record of 31–31.

Cora was interviewed by the Milwaukee Brewers for their managerial opening in October 2010. He was believed to be a finalist along with Bob Melvin, Bobby Valentine, and Ron Roenicke.

Cora was dismissed by the White Sox on September 27, 2011, the day after they released Guillén from his contract, despite initially tabbing Cora to manage the final two games of the season. Cora was named bench coach of the Miami Marlins on November 1, 2011, reuniting with Guillén. Cora took over as interim manager for the Marlins on April 10, 2012 in the wake of Guillén's five-game suspension for comments related to Fidel Castro.

In 2016, Cora became the manager of the Pittsburgh Pirates Double-A club, the Altoona Curve. He became the ninth manager in franchise history. He was promoted to third base coach for the major league team for the 2017 season. Cora was dismissed from his role following the 2021 season on October 9, 2021.

On January 5, 2022, Cora was hired by the New York Mets to serve as the team's third base coach for the 2022 season.

Broadcasting career
Cora served as a guest analyst on MLB Network's 2013 World Baseball Classic coverage and subsequently joined the network as an analyst. He debuted on MLB Tonight on May 6, 2013.

Personal life
Cora is the elder brother of former MLB player and current Boston Red Sox manager Alex Cora. Both brothers have been part of at least one World Series-winning team. Joey was a third base coach for the 2005 World Champion Chicago White Sox. Alex was a shortstop and second baseman for the 2007 World Champion Boston Red Sox, a coach for the 2017 World Champion Houston Astros, and the manager of the 2018 World Champion Boston Red Sox.

See also

 List of Major League Baseball players from Puerto Rico

References

External links

1965 births
Living people
Altoona Curve managers
American League All-Stars
Beaumont Golden Gators players
Chatham Anglers players
Chicago White Sox coaches
Chicago White Sox players
Cleveland Indians players
Las Vegas Stars (baseball) players
Major League Baseball bench coaches
Major League Baseball players from Puerto Rico
Major League Baseball second basemen
Major League Baseball shortstops
Major League Baseball third basemen
Major League Baseball third base coaches
Miami Marlins coaches
MLB Network personalities
People from Caguas, Puerto Rico
Pittsburgh Pirates coaches
New York Mets coaches
San Diego Padres players
Seattle Mariners players
South Bend White Sox players
South Bend Silver Hawks players
Spokane Indians players
Stabbing survivors